Swiss movement may refer to:
 Swiss Movement (album), a jazz album by Les McCann and Eddie Harris.
 Swiss Movement (label), Swiss made watch movements
 Swiss-system tournament, the system used for organizing competitions in some games